CGTU may refer to
 Confederación General del Trabajo del Uruguay, a trade union confederation in Uruguay active from 1929 to 1934
 Confédération générale du travail unitaire, a trade union confederation in France founded in 1922.